Moshe Goshen-Gottstein (Hebrew: משה גושן-גוטשטיין) (6 September 1925 – 14 September 1991) was a German-born professor of Semitic linguistics and biblical philology at the Hebrew University of Jerusalem, and director of the lexicographical institute and Biblical research institute of Bar-Ilan University.

Biography
Moshe Goshen-Gottstein was born in Berlin. He immigrated to Palestine in 1939 to escape the Nazis, and studied at the Hebrew University of Jerusalem. He married Esther Hepner, a clinical psychologist, and had two sons, Alon (who is now director of the Elijah Interfaith Institute) and Yonatan. He was a resident of Talbiya, Jerusalem.

Esther Goshen-Gottstein wrote a book about her husband's recovery from a four-month coma in the wake of heart surgery, "Recalled to Life: The Story of a Coma."

Academic career

From 1950 on, Goshen-Gottstein taught at Hebrew University. He became a professor in 1967. Goshen-Gottstein made important contributions in the areas of Biblical studies, Hebrew linguistics and Semitic linguistics. His numerous articles and books included "Medieval Hebrew syntax and Vocabulary as Influenced by Arabic", "Introduction to the Lexicography of Modern Hebrew" and "The Aleppo Codex" (in which he established the authenticity of this codex). He worked on several dictionaries, among them the "Millon ha-Ivrit ha-Hadashah" ("Dictionary of Modern Hebrew"), the first synchronic dictionary of Hebrew. He was the founder of the Hebrew University Bible Project, which he directed for many years.

Awards
In 1988, Goshen-Gottstein was awarded the Israel Prize in Jewish studies

Journal publications

 'The Aleppo Codex and the Rise of the Massoretic Bible Text', Near Eastern Archaeology vol. 42, no. 3, 1979:

See also
List of Israel Prize recipients

References

1925 births
1991 deaths
Linguists from Israel
Jewish biblical scholars
German biblical scholars
Israeli biblical scholars
Grammarians of Hebrew
Israeli lexicographers
Jewish emigrants from Nazi Germany to Mandatory Palestine
Israel Prize in Jewish studies recipients
Academic staff of Bar-Ilan University
20th-century Jewish biblical scholars
20th-century linguists
20th-century lexicographers